José Borello (24 November 1929 – 14 October 2013) was an Argentine footballer who played as a forward for a number of clubs in Argentina and Chile. He also represented the Argentina national team in 1954 and 1955.

Honours
 Argentine Primera División top scorer: 1954

References

External links
 
 Profile at Historiadeboca Profile at

1929 births
2013 deaths
Argentine footballers
Association football forwards
Argentina international footballers
Estudiantes de La Plata footballers
Club Atlético Platense footballers
Chacarita Juniors footballers
Boca Juniors footballers
Olimpo footballers
Club Atlético Lanús footballers
Magallanes footballers
Ñublense footballers
Copa América-winning players
Argentine expatriate footballers
Argentine expatriate sportspeople in Chile
Expatriate footballers in Chile
Sportspeople from Bahía Blanca